This was the first edition of the tournament.

Pablo Andújar won the title after defeating Marco Trungelliti 7–5, 6–3 in the final.

Seeds

Draw

Finals

Top half

Bottom half

References
Main Draw
Qualifying Draw

Firenze Tennis Cup - Singles